Bwe'' or Bwe Karen''' may be,

Bwe Karen people
Bwe Karen language